General elections were held in SR Montenegro on 9 December 1990, with a second round of the presidential election held on 23 December. Momir Bulatović of the League of Communists won the presidential election, whilst his party emerged as the largest in Parliament, winning 83 of the 125 seats.

Results

President
In order to be elected in the first round, a candidate had to cross a threshold of 50% of the registered voters. Although incumbent President of the Presidency Momir Bulatović received 62% of the valid votes, this was only 42.2% of the registered voters. However, he went on to win the second round convincingly against Ljubiša Stanković of the Union of Reform Forces of Yugoslavia, becoming the first elected President of Montenegro.

National Assembly

References

Montenegro
General
Montenegro
Presidential elections in Montenegro
Elections in Montenegro